Joseph D. Sneed (September 23, 1938 –  February 7, 2020) was an American physicist, and philosopher at the Colorado School of Mines.

Early life
He was born in Durant, OK. His father, Dabney W. Sneed, was a civil servant with the Postal Service and later an architect for the Federal Housing Administration. His mother, Sallabelle Atkison Sneed, was a homemaker and elementary school teacher.

Education
He attended public schools in Durant, OK and Tulsa, OK. He received a B.S. in physics from Rice University in 1960, an MS in physics from the University of Illinois in 1962 and a Ph.D. in philosophy from Stanford University in 1964. His mentor at Stanford was Patrick Suppes. His view of the nature of philosophy was shaped at Stanford by Donald Davidson. At Stanford he was also a student of Richard C. Jeffrey.

Work
With his book The Logical Structure of Mathematical Physics, published in 1971, and other contributions to the philosophy of science Sneed founded the structural theory of the empirical sciences. He was influenced by and influenced Wolfgang Stegmuller and Thomas Kuhn.

Bibliography
 J. D. Sneed, The Logical Structure of Mathematical Physics. Reidel, Dordrecht, 1971 (revised edition 1979).
 W. Balzer, C. U. Moulines, J. D. Sneed, An Architectonic for Science: the Structuralist Approach. Reidel, Dordrecht, 1987.

See also
American philosophy
List of American philosophers

References

Further reading
 C. M. Dawe, The Structure of Genetics, PhD dissertation. University of London. 1982.

External links
 Webpage of J. Sneed at the Colorado School of Mines
 

1938 births
Living people
20th-century American philosophers
21st-century American philosophers
Colorado School of Mines faculty
Rice University alumni
21st-century American physicists
Analytic philosophers